Alien Exorcism, also known as 6 Days on Earth, is a 2011 Italian science fiction film directed by Varo Venturi. It stars Massimo Poggio, Laura Glavan and Marina Kazankova. Supporting actors include Ludovico Fremont and Pier Giorgio Bellocchio. It was shot both in English and Italian.

It has been selected to be featured at the 33° Moscow International Film Festival.

Premise
Dr. Davide Piso is a courageous scientist who has been studying thousands of cases involving alien abductions with the aid of hypnosis. When the scientist decides to help Saturnia, a seductive teenager that believes herself to be an alien abductee and shows a clear attraction for him, he faces an insurmountable problem: once hypnotised, Saturnia cannot leave the trance condition anymore, hence giving manifestation to Hexabor of Ur, an alien entity coming from Mesopotamian ages. Hexabor considers himself a demi-god and wants to exploit a special human energy: the soul.

Cast
  as Dr. Davide Piso
  as Saturnia / Hexabor of Ur
 Marina Kazankova as Elena
 Ludovico Fremont as Leo
 Varo Venturi as Father Trismegisto
  Bellocchio as Lieutenant Bruni
 Nazzareno Bomba as Giovanni Cervo
 Emilian Cerniceanu as Matei
  as Countess Gotha-Varano
  as Prince Gotha-Varano
 Ruby Kammer as Rita
 Ferdinando Vales as Doc Enlil
 Daniele Bernardi as J.J. Enki
 Leon Kammer as Bill
 David Traylor as Danny

References

External links 

 
 
 Il Sole 24 Ore film sheet: http://cinema.ilsole24ore.com/film/6-giorni-sulla-terra/
 Pressbook (in Italian)

2011 films
2010s Italian-language films
2010s science fiction thriller films
Italian science fiction thriller films
Alien abduction films
Films scored by Reinhold Heil
Films scored by Johnny Klimek
2010s English-language films